KrasAir or Krasnoyarsk Airlines was a Russian airline with its head office on the grounds of Krasnoyarsk Yemelyanovo Airport in Krasnoyarsk. It operated scheduled regional and international passenger services, freight transport, cargo handling and charter services from the main base is Krasnoyarsk Yemelyanovo Airport, as part of AiRUnion alliance. In 2008 Krasair suffered a liquidity crisis, and after a string of operational shutdowns, administrative and strikes, the company ceased operations in October 2008.

History

Privatization 
The company traces its roots to the Krasnoyarsk-based Yenisey air wing, established by the Chief Directorate of the Northern Sea Route in May, 1934. The air wing eventually differentiated into traditional airline operations, and was as Krasnoyarsk Civil Aviation Directorate (1946–1982) and Krasnoyarsk Aviation Enterprize (1982–1993). In 1993 it was privatized with the state retaining 51% controlling share.

AiRUnion 
KrasAir was managed by Boris Abramovich (CEO, no relation to Roman Abramovich) and his brother Alexander Abramovich (deputy CEO). The Abramovich brothers' aggressive expansion campaign led to the creation of AiRUnion alliance in 2005, the first airline alliance in Russia. It includes KrasAir, Domodedovo Airlines, Samara Airlines, Omskavia and Sibaviatrans and was the third largest domestic carrier in Russia. All of the member airlines were controlled by Krasair management. 

In 2005 KrasAir attempted to expand internationally, placing a winning bid in Hungary's national carrier Malév privatisation tender. The tender results were initially annulled by Hungarian authorities before finally being sold in February 2007. During 2006 1,118,543 passengers were transported by KrasAir and AiRUnion transported 3,342,815 passengers

KrasAir managers were part of a venture together with the European Bank of Reconstruction and Development to create a new low-cost airline called Sky Express. This airline was to be based at Vnukovo Airport and fly initially to domestic routes, using as many as 44 Boeing 737-300/500s. The airline's airfares were to be 30-40% cheaper than other carriers.

2008 crisis 
In June and August 2008 Krasair and AiRUnion fleets were grounded as the fuel suppliers denied further credit fuel to debt-ridden airlines. In June, Krasair and its principal supplier, Krasnoyarsk-based Sibir Avia Service, reached an agreement to resume fuel supply on condition that Krasair debt did not exceed 100 million roubles. By the middle of August the debt rose to 223 million roubles, and on August 19 Sibir Avia stopped refuelling, leaving thousands of passengers stranded in airports. Krasair blamed the crisis on rising oil prices. In first six months of 2008, fuel accounted for 54% of Krasair costs. Flights were also grounded in Moscow and Omsk airports.

Analysts predicted that the fuel crisis would be resolved through intervention of Rostechhologii, a newly formed state conglomerate that controls substantial shares of AiRUnion companies, including Krasair; alternatively, the state may prefer to complete formal bankruptcy process and restructure AiRUnion assets under a new management. On August 24, Prime Minister Vladimir Putin specifically addressed the problem of the grounded airline, authorizing Sergey Ivanov to issue state funds and enable further operations.

On August 26, media reports appeared to indicate that bankruptcy was inevitable. Russian Technologies, the principal shareholder, refused to pay AiRUnion's bills and its fleet remained grounded. The same day, the Russian Ministry of Transportation negotiated with Aeroflot, Transaero, S7 Airlines and Rossiya about taking over the routes previously operated by Krasair.

On October 27, Krasair was unable to fly most of their aircraft due to a pilots' strike as a refusal by refuelling companies to extend credit to the airline.  It was announced that Krasair would cease to exist on November 1, 2008.

Destinations

Fleet 
Throughout their history, KrasAir operated the following types of aircraft:

References

External links 

KrasAir (Archive) 
KrasAir Fleet

Companies based in Krasnoyarsk
Former Aeroflot divisions
Airlines established in 1993
Defunct airlines of Russia
Airlines disestablished in 2008